Bonnyville Airport  is located  north of Bonnyville, Alberta, Canada.

Airlines and destinations

References

External links

Page about this airport on COPA's Places to Fly airport directory

Registered aerodromes in Alberta
Municipal District of Bonnyville No. 87